Stacy McGaugh (born January 11, 1964) is an American astronomer and professor in the Department of Astronomy at Case Western Reserve University in Cleveland, Ohio. His fields of specialty include low surface brightness galaxies, galaxy formation and evolution, tests of dark matter and alternative hypotheses, and measurements of cosmological parameters.

Stacy McGaugh was an undergraduate student at MIT (S.B. 1985) and a graduate student at Princeton and the University of Michigan (Ph.D. 1992). He held postdoctoral appointments at Cambridge University, the Carnegie Institution of Washington, and Rutgers University before joining the faculty of the University of Maryland in 1998.  He moved to Case Western in 2012.  He is married with two children.  He is a Distinguished Alumnus of Flint (Michigan) Northern High School (2001) and of the Astronomy Department of the University of Michigan (2013).

Known in the field of extragalactic astronomy for his early work on Low Surface Brightness Galaxies and the elemental abundances in HII Regions, McGaugh has also contributed to the study of the kinematics of galaxies, being among the first to point out that low surface brightness galaxies are dark matter dominated and that they pose the cuspy halo problem. He also coined the expression "baryonic Tully–Fisher relation."  He predicted the first to second peak amplitude ratio of the acoustic power spectrum of the Cosmic microwave background radiation.  McGaugh found surprising support for the Modified Newtonian dynamics proposed by Mordehai Milgrom as an alternative to Dark matter in his work on Low Surface Brightness Galaxies. This has proven to be very controversial since it implies the non-existence of the non-baryonic dark matter that is central to physical cosmology.
Nevertheless, his predictions for the mass distribution of the Milky Way and the velocity dispersions of the dwarf Spheroidal satellites of the Andromeda spiral galaxy have largely been confirmed by subsequent observations.

In 2016 McGaugh, Lelli, and Schombert reported a correlation between a radial acceleration relation (RAR) found among galactic rotation curves and the baryonic Tully-Fisher relation's prediction for galactic rotation curves. According to Paranjape and Sheth, this RAR has important implications for the ΛCDM paradigm and alternative gravity theories.

See also
 Low Surface Brightness Galaxies
 Dark matter
 Modified Newtonian dynamics

References

External links

 Stacy McGaugh's home page
 The MOND pages
 Triton Station — A Blog About the Science and Sociology of Cosmology and Dark Matter
 Experimental Searches for Dark Matter
 S. McGaugh @ Astrophysics Data System
 Dark Matter or Modified Gravity? - Stacy McGaugh – YouTube, July 2, 2015
 
 

1964 births
Living people
American astronomers
Massachusetts Institute of Technology alumni
University of Michigan alumni
University of Maryland, College Park faculty
Case Western Reserve University faculty